Komsomol'skoe or Komsomolskoye (Komsomol) is a town in Kobda District in the Aktobe Region of western Kazakhstan.
It lies along the R-76 road which connects it to Taldysay in the west.

References

Populated places in Aktobe Region